RAS p21 protein activator 2 is a protein that in humans is encoded by the RASA2 gene.

Function

The protein encoded by this gene is member of the GAP1 family of GTPase-activating proteins. The gene product stimulates the GTPase activity of normal RAS p21 but not its oncogenic counterpart. Acting as a suppressor of RAS function, the protein enhances the weak intrinsic GTPase activity of RAS proteins resulting in the inactive GDP-bound form of RAS, thereby allowing control of cellular proliferation and differentiation. Alternative splicing results in multiple transcript variants. [provided by RefSeq, Dec 2014].

References

Further reading